2020 LendingTree Bowl may refer to:

 2020 LendingTree Bowl (January), a bowl game following the 2019 season, between Louisiana and Miami (OH)
 2020 LendingTree Bowl (December), a bowl game following the 2020 season, between Western Kentucky and Georgia State